Golden West Books is a privately owned American publishing company specializing in American Railroads.  Donald Duke founded the company in 1960, and wrote some of its titles.  Its headquarters are in San Marino, California.  The company's titles cover steam locomotives, diesel locomotives, logging railroads, mining railways, funiculars, the caboose, electric interurbans, Inter-city rail and histories of the Santa Fe Railroad.  Model railroad-oriented hobby retail shops sell some of Golden West's books.

References

External links
 
Donald Duke Obituary, Los Angeles Times, October 10, 2010.

Rail transport publishing companies
Companies based in Los Angeles County, California
Book publishing companies based in California
Publishing companies established in 1960